Mark Klein is a former AT&T technician and whistleblower who revealed details of the company's cooperation with the United States National Security Agency in installing network hardware at a site known as Room 641A to monitor, capture and process American telecommunications.  The subsequent media coverage became a major story in May 2006. He wrote a book about the NSA and AT&T's cooperation in surveiling everyone on the internet and his experience in discovering it and trying to tell the public called Wiring Up The Big Brother Machine...And Fighting It.

In recognition of his actions, the Electronic Frontier Foundation picked Klein as one of the winners of its 2008 Pioneer Awards.

For over 22 years Mark Klein worked for AT&T. Starting with the company as a Communications Technician in New York, where he remained from November 1981 until March 1991, he later continued in that capacity in California until 1998. From January 1998 to October 2003, Klein worked as a Computer Network Associate in San Francisco. Starting in October 2003, he returned to the role of Communications Technician, after which he retired in May 2004.

See also
 Hepting vs. AT&T – The lawsuit filed by the Electronic Frontier Foundation against AT&T for Mark Kleins' revelations
 Jewel v. NSA
 William Binney and Diane Roark
 Thomas Andrews Drake
 Perry Fellwock
 Edward Snowden
 Thomas Tamm
 Russ Tice

References

External links
 Klein's Declaration (unredacted), from the case Hepting v. AT&T - Electronic Frontier Foundation
 ABC Nightline Interview with Klein
 
 Wired coverage
 PBS NOW | Whistleblower Mark Klein
 PBS NOW | For Your Eyes Only?
 Spying On The Home Front, Frontline, PBS
 A Story of Surveillance, Washington Post, November 7, 2007
 First Interview with the NSA Whistleblower at EFF
 Wiring Up the Big Brother Machine ...And Fighting It  by Mark Klein
 Wired (2008) interview with Klein

American whistleblowers
National Security Agency
Year of birth missing (living people)
Living people
American computer specialists
AT&T people